David Finlay III (born 16 May 1993) is a German-born Irish-American professional wrestler who performs under the ring name . He is signed to New Japan Pro-Wrestling (NJPW) and also performs for Impact Wrestling, where he is a former Impact World Tag Team Champion. As of March 2023, he is a member and the seventh and current leader of Bullet Club.

Born in Germany to Irish parents, he is a fourth-generation professional wrestler; his father, Fit Finlay, trained him before he received additional training from Satoshi Kojima and the NJPW Dojo. He frequently partners with Juice Robinson as the team FinJuice; they are one-time IWGP Tag Team Champions. Finlay, along with Ricochet and Satoshi Kojima, is a former NEVER Openweight 6-Man Tag Team Champion.

Early life
David Finlay III was born on 16 May 1993 in Hanover, the son of Northern Irish parents Fit Finlay and Melanie Duffin. He has stated that he wanted to be a wrestler since he was young, being inspired by watching his father wrestle. Finlay grew up in a wrestling family and is a fourth-generation professional wrestler; his grandfather David "Dave" Finlay Sr., as well as both of his great-grandfathers William Finlay and John Liddell, were all professional wrestlers. His paternal aunt was a referee.

Professional wrestling career

Early career (2012–2015)
On 22 December 2012, Finlay made his professional wrestling debut for German promotion European Wrestling Promotion (EWP). He defeated Big Daddy Walter by disqualification. Later that evening, he teamed up with his father for a tag team match against Robbie Brookside and Dan Collins, which they won; it was also his father's retirement match. In 2014, Finlay became the inaugural Power of Wrestling Junior Champion. He held the title for 314 days before vacating it on 20 August 2015, due to his signing with New Japan Pro-Wrestling.

New Japan Pro-Wrestling (2015–present)

FinJuice (2015–2022)

Finlay entered the 2015 Best of the Super Juniors tournament hosted by New Japan Pro-Wrestling, but failed to win, losing all his matches in the tournament and ending with a final tally of 0 points. After the tournament, Finlay was announced as a "young lion". He would carry this moniker until September 2016, Finlay announced he was no longer a young lion.

At the Destruction in Kobe event on 25 September, he won the NEVER Openweight 6-Man Tag Team Championship with Ricochet and Satoshi Kojima by defeating Bullet Club (Nick Jackson, Matt Jackson and Adam Cole). They lost the titles at Wrestle Kingdom 11 on 4 January 2017 to Los Ingobernables de Japón (Evil, Bushi and Sanada). At Wrestling Dontaku in May, Finlay was defeated by Cody. In August, he formed a tag team with Juice Robinson, dubbed FinJuice. They teamed for the rest of the year before going their separate ways for the NJPW World Tag League in December, which saw Robinson teaming with Sami Callihan, while Finlay teamed with Katsuya Kitamura. Finlay and Kitamura failed to win the tournament, ending with 0 points.

At Strong Style Evolved in March 2018, Finlay attacked Jay White, after White's successful defense of the IWGP United States Heavyweight Championship over Hangman Page. Finlay was granted a title shot, but at the main event of Road to Wrestling Dontaku, he was defeated by White. Finlay returned to teaming with Robinson and other Taguchi Japan members for the remainder of the year; he and Robinson participated in the 2018 World Tag League, where they finished with a record of eight wins and five losses, failing to advance to the finals. Their final block match against Best Friends (Beretta and Chuckie T.) ended by disqualification, when Chuckie, who had recently been prone to violent outbursts, struck Finlay in the back with a chair. At New Years's Dash!! 2019, another match between FinJuice and Best Friends ended in a disqualification, when Chuckie once again struck Finlay in the back with a chair. On day one of The New Beginning in USA, Finlay defeated Chuckie in a no disqualification match, ending their feud.

Finlay was announced for the 2019 New Japan Cup, however on 23 February 2019, he suffered a shoulder injury removing him from the tournament. The injury happened during FinJuice's ROH World Tag Team Championship match again the champions The Briscoes at the Honor Rising NJPW/ROH event. It was later revealed to be a torn labrum and that he would be out of action for around six months. On 14 October at King of Pro-Wrestling, Finlay made his return to the company, by making the save on Robinson who was being attacked by Lance Archer, after their match for the vacant IWGP United States Heavyweight Championship. He then challenged Archer to a title shot a later date. This happened at Showdown in San Jose, but he was defeated by Archer. At Showdown in Los Angeles, Finlay, Robinson and Clark Connors were defeated by Suzuki-gun (Minoru Suzuki, Archer and El Desperado). Finlay would go on to enter the 2019 World Tag League with Robinson where they made it to the finals defeating Evil and Sanada of Los Ingobernables de Japón and earning a shot at the IWGP Tag Team Championship titles against Guerrillas of Destiny (G.O.D) during the first of Wrestle Kingdom 14 on 4 January 2020. They would go on to defeat G.O.D to win the championship at the event on 4 January 2020. They lost the titles back to G.O.D at The New Beginning USA on February 1.

In March 2020, New Japan suspended all of its activities, due to the COVID-19 pandemic, causing many Non-Japanese talent to not be able to travel to Japan to comptete, including Finlay. Therefore, a new American based NJPW show was produced, called NJPW Strong After a 6-month absence from in-ring competition, Finlay made his Strong debut in August, participating in the inaugural New Japan Cup USA tournament. He defeated, Chase Owens in the quarterfinals round and Tama Tonga in the semifinals. In the finals, Finlay lost to Kenta.

In November, Finlay and Robinson both returned to Japan to compete in the 2020 World Tag League tournament. FinJuice topped the table with 12 points, but lost to the Guerillas of Destiny in the finals. In March 2021, Finlay entered the New Japan Cup. He defeated Chase Owens and Yoshi-Hashi to advance to the quarter-finals. In the quarter-finals, Finlay achieved a massive win by defeating the NEVER Openweight Champion, Jay White. In the semi-final round, Finlay lost to eventual cup winner, Will Ospreay. Due to his quarter-final victory, Finlay received a shot at the Never Openweight Championship at NJPW Resurgence.  In August at the event, White retained the title against Finlay. In April 2022, at Windy City Riot, FinJuice and Brody King defeated TMDK in a 6-man tag-team street fight match.

After Juice Robinson turned heel by joining Bullet Club and seemingly breaking up FinJuice, Finlay focused on solely singles competition. In June, Finlay was announced to be making his G1 debut in the G1 Climax 32 tournament, competing in the D Block. Finlay ended his first G1 with 6 points, although he earnt points off of wins against IWGP United States Heavyweight Champion Will Ospreay, former IWGP World Heavyweight Champion Shingo Takagi and Juice Robinson.

Bullet Club leader (2023–present)

At the Battle in the Valley event on 18 February 2023, Finlay attacked his longtime rival, Jay White, before he could address the fans one last time. At the NJPW 51st Anniversary Show, Finlay defeated Tomohiro Ishii in the first round of the New Japan Cup, during his entrance he was accompanied by Gedo. After the match, Gedo cut a promo after the match saying "Bullet Club needs a rebel" and it doesn't matter that White is no longer there, becoming the new leader of the faction.

Ring of Honor (2016–2019)
Prior to Finlay's official debut for Ring of Honor in January 2019, his previous involvement with the American promotion was at the NJPW-ROH promoted Honor Rising: Japan shows, held in Korakuen Hall. His first appearance in this capacity was on 20 February 2016, where he was defeated by Jay White. In February 2017, Finlay tagged with Juice Robinson and Kushida, defeating Jado & Gedo and Silas Young, but the following night, he and Kushida lost to Young and Jado. In February 2018, Finlay was again involved in tag matches, tagging with Robinson in a defeat to The Young Bucks, and the following night, he, Robinson and Jay Lethal defeated Bullet Club (Chase Owens, Hikuleo and Yujiro Takahashi).

Finlay made his debut for Ring of Honor during the January 2019 TV tapings, in a loss to Tracy Williams. Robinson later announced the formation of Lifeblood, with the goal of bringing honor back to ROH; the stable included Finlay, Williams, Bandido, Mark Haskins and Tenille Dashwood. Lifeblood defeated Jay Lethal's handpicked team of Jonathan Gresham, Flip Gordon, Dalton Castle and Jeff Cobb in the main event. Finlay and Robinson, representing Lifeblood, participated in the Tag Wars Tournament. In the first round, they beat Alex Coughlin and Karl Fredericks, and in the semi-finals, they won in a three-way dance over Lethal and Gresham and Coast 2 Coast (LSG and Shaheem Ali). In the final, they were defeated by Villain Enterprises (Brody King and PCO).

Consejo Mundial de Lucha Libre (2018)
On October 5, 2018, Finlay participated in Consejo Mundial de Lucha Libre's CMLL International Gran Prix, as part of the Resto del Mundo team, and as a representative of New Japan Pro-Wrestling. He lasted 29 minutes and 40 seconds, before being eliminated by Carístico. During October, he appeared in multiple tag team matches, all with the stipulation of two out of three falls.

Impact Wrestling (2021) 
On February 13, 2021, at No Surrender, a video package aired promoting Finlay along with his tag team partner Juice Robinson (collectively known as FinJuice) arriving to Impact Wrestling as part of a partnership between Impact and New Japan Pro-Wrestling. They feuded with The Good Brothers (Doc Gallows and Karl Anderson), defeating them at Sacrifice to win the Impact World Tag Team Championship.

All Elite Wrestling (2022)
On the June 8, 2022 episode of AEW Dynamite, Finlay made his All Elite Wrestling debut, in a losing effort to Adam Page.

Personal life
Finlay resides in Atlanta, Georgia. He became engaged to his girlfriend Ana Scott on 9 May 2017, and they were married on 13 May 2018.

Championships and accomplishments
Impact Wrestling
Impact World Tag Team Championship (1 time) – with Juice Robinson
 New Japan Pro-Wrestling
 IWGP Tag Team Championship (1 time) – with Juice Robinson
 NEVER Openweight 6-Man Tag Team Championship (1 time) – with Ricochet and Satoshi Kojima
 World Tag League (2019) – with Juice Robinson
 Power of Wrestling
 POW Junior Championship (1 time)
Pro Wrestling Illustrated
Ranked No. 233 of the top 500 singles wrestlers in the PWI 500 in 2020

References

External links

Living people
1993 births
American people of Northern Ireland descent
American male professional wrestlers
German male professional wrestlers
German people of Northern Ireland descent
German emigrants to the United States
Expatriate professional wrestlers in Japan
Sportspeople from Hanover
Sportspeople from Atlanta
TNA/Impact World Tag Team Champions
21st-century professional wrestlers
NEVER Openweight 6-Man Tag Team Champions
IWGP Heavyweight Tag Team Champions
Bullet Club members